Margarella subantarctica is a species of sea snail, a marine gastropod mollusk in the family Calliostomatidae.

Description
The height of the shell attains 1.5 mm.

Distribution
This marine species occurs off South Georgia Islands.

References

 Strebel, H. 1908. Die Gastropoden (mit Ausnahme de nackten Opisthobranchier). Wissenschaftliche Ergebnisse der Schwedischen Südpolar-Expedition 1901-1903 6(1): 111 pp., 6 pls

External links
 To Biodiversity Heritage Library (1 publication)
 To Encyclopedia of Life
 To World Register of Marine Species

subantarctica
Gastropods described in 1908